Across the River may refer to:

"Across the River" (Bruce Hornsby song), a 1990 hit song by Bruce Hornsby and the Range from the album A Night on the Town
"Across the River", a song by Peter Gabriel from Secret World Live
Across the River (film), a 2016 British drama film

See also
 Across the River and into the Trees, a 1950 novel by Ernest Hemingway
 Across the River to Motor City, a Canadian television drama series of 2007-08
 "Let us cross over the river and rest under the shade of the trees", last words of U.S. Civil War General Stonewall Jackson